Oleh Ivashchenko is a retired Soviet and Ukrainian football player.

Career
Oleh Ivashchenko started his career in 1985 with Desna Chernihiv, then he moved to Khimik Chernihiv, where he won the  Chernihiv Oblast Football Championship and the Chernihiv Oblast Football Cup in 1985. Then he returned to Desna Chernihiv and in 1993 he moved to Cheksyl Chernihiv for one season where he played 12 matches. In 1994 he returned to Desna Chernihiv for three season where he played 89 and scored 3 goals where he won the Ukrainian Second League in season 1996–97. In 1997 he played 16 matches with Slavutich-ChNPP" Slavutich and 6 with Domostroitel Chernihiv. In 1999 he played 8 matches again with Desna Chernihiv.

Honours
Desna Chernihiv
 Ukrainian Second League: 1996–97

Khimik Chernihiv
 Chernihiv Oblast Football Championship: 1985
 Chernihiv Oblast Football Cup: 1985

References

External links 
 Oleh Ivashchenko footballfacts.ru

1964 births
Living people
Footballers from Chernihiv
Soviet footballers
FC Desna Chernihiv players
FC Khimik Chernihiv players
FC Cheksyl Chernihiv players
FC Slavutych players
Ukrainian footballers
Ukrainian Second League players
Association football midfielders